Henry Moreton Stevens (1854 - 15 November 1935) was a member of the Queensland Legislative Assembly.

Biography
Stevens was born at South Brisbane, Queensland, the son of Samuel Stevens, and his wife Jane (née Colton). Samuel Stevens was a cooper and an active member of the South Brisbane community, who stood for a seat as Alderman in the council elections of 1866. Henry was educated at the Brisbane National School and was a director of the Lanefield Co-Operative Dairy Co. and also the Queensland Farmers' Co-Operative District Co..

On 27 October 1880 he married Helen Hunt Mossop (died 1904) at Goodna and together had one son and one daughter. Helen died in 1904 and Stevens then married Jessie Mabel Webster (died 1956) on 26 April 1911. He died in November 1935 and his funeral proceeded from the Rosewood Congregational Church to the Tallegalla Cemetery.

Public life
Stevens, the Ministerialist candidate, won the by-election in 1911 for the seat of Rosewood in the Queensland Legislative Assembly, replacing Denis Keogh, who had died in August of that year. He held the seat until the 1918 state election, when he lost to William Cooper of the Labor Party.

References

Members of the Queensland Legislative Assembly
1854 births
1935 deaths